Te Paki Sand Dunes, also called the Giant Sand Dunes, are a collection of sand dunes located on the Northland Peninsula of New Zealand. The dunes abut the Ninety Mile Beach and are a popular spot for sandboarding.

Geography
The dunes are located on the western (Tasman Sea) side of the Aupouri Peninsula and are southeast of Cape Reinga Lighthouse.

Te Paki stream runs through the area and contains many native flora and fauna.

Sandboarding
Sandsurfing is a popular activity at the dunes. Guided tours around Cape Reinga often stop at the dunes to sandboard.

References

Sandboarding locations
Far North District
Dunes of Oceania